is a railway station in Iwaki, Fukushima, Japan, operated by East Japan Railway Company (JR East).

Lines

Station layout
The station has an island platform and a side platform connected by a footbridge. It became an unstaffed station on March 14, 2020.

Platforms

History
Kusano Station opened on August 29, 1897. The station was absorbed into the JR East network upon the privatization of Japanese National Railways (JNR) on April 1, 1987.  Services were suspended from March 11 to April 17, 2011, following the 2011 Tōhoku earthquake and tsunami.

Passenger statistics
In fiscal 2018, the station was used by an average of 397 passengers daily (boarding passengers only).

Surrounding area
 Kusano Post Office

See also
 List of railway stations in Japan

External links

References

Stations of East Japan Railway Company
Railway stations in Fukushima Prefecture
Jōban Line
Railway stations in Japan opened in 1897
Iwaki, Fukushima